An alderman is a member of a municipal assembly or council in many jurisdictions.

Alderman may also refer to:

 Alderman (surname)
 Alderman Lesmond (born 1978), West Indian cricketer
 Alderman Fitzwarren, character in Dick Whittington.

See also 
 Alderman House
 Alderman Islands
 Alderman's Green
 Ealdorman